Andrey Mizurov (born March 16, 1973) is a Kazakhstani former professional road bicycle racer.

Major results

1991
1st  Overall Giro della Lunigiana
1997
1st  Overall Azerbaïjan Tour
1st  Overall Tour of Croatia
1998
2nd Time trial, National Road Championships
10th Overall Tour de Langkawi
1999
1st  Road race, National Road Championships
2000
National Road Championships
2nd Time trial
3rd Road race
2001
National Road Championships
1st  Road race
4th Time trial
2002
National Road Championships
1st  Time trial
4th Road race
2003
10th Paris–Bourges
2004
National Road Championships
1st  Road race
2nd Time trial
1st Stage 7 Tour of Qinghai Lake
4th Tro-Bro Léon
9th Overall Route du Sud
9th Overall Tour de la Somme
2005
1st UCI Asia Tour
1st  Overall Tour of China
1st Stage 1 (ITT)
1st  Overall Vuelta a la Independencia Nacional
1st Stage ?
1st GP Jamp
2nd Overall Tour of Japan
1st Stage 4
2nd Road race, National Road Championships
5th Overall Circuito Montañés
9th Overall Tour of Qinghai Lake
2006
3rd  Time trial, Asian Games
3rd Overall Tour de Guadeloupe
1st Stages 2a, 2b (ITT) & 9b
3rd Overall Tour of Japan
5th Overall Tour de Bretagne
1st Stage 2
2007
National Road Championships
2nd Road race
3rd Time trial
8th Time trial, UCI Road World Championships
2008
1st  Time trial, National Road Championships
2009
1st  Overall Tour of Qinghai Lake
1st Prologue
1st  Overall Tour de East Java
1st Stage 2
1st  Time trial, National Road Championships
2nd Overall Tour of Iran
3rd Overall Tour de Indonesia
1st Stage 1 (TTT)
4th Overall Tour de Singkarak
10th Overall Tour de Kumano
10th Overall Tour of Bulgaria
2010
1st  Time trial, Asian Cycling Championships
1st  Time trial, National Road Championships
1st  Overall Tour de Kumano
2nd Overall Tour of Japan
5th Overall International Azerbaïjan Tour
1st Stage 3
5th Overall Tour Cycliste International de la Guadeloupe
6th Overall Tour of Qinghai Lake
2011
National Road Championships
1st  Road race
2nd Time trial
10th Overall Tour of Austria
2012
4th Time trial, National Road Championships
8th Overall Tour of Qinghai Lake
2013
1st  Time trial, National Road Championships
Asian Cycling Championships
2nd  Time trial
3rd  Road race
3rd Overall Tour du Maroc
4th Overall Tour of Qinghai Lake
2014
6th Time trial, National Road Championships

References

External links
 
 

Kazakhstani male cyclists
Tour de Guadeloupe stage winners
1973 births
Living people
Olympic cyclists of Kazakhstan
Cyclists at the 2004 Summer Olympics
Cyclists at the 2008 Summer Olympics
Asian Games medalists in cycling
Cyclists at the 1994 Asian Games
Cyclists at the 2006 Asian Games
Cyclists at the 2010 Asian Games
Asian Games gold medalists for Kazakhstan
Asian Games bronze medalists for Kazakhstan
Medalists at the 1994 Asian Games
Medalists at the 2006 Asian Games